This is a list of works by Gene Wolfe, an American author of science fiction and fantasy, with a career spanning six decades.

Novels

Story collections 
The Island of Doctor Death and Other Stories and Other Stories (1980) (Not an error but a literary joke; the title story is "The Island of Doctor Death and Other Stories". Among others, the collection also includes "The Death of Dr. Island" and "The Doctor of Death Island." "The Death of Dr. Island" won the Nebula Award for Best Novella.)
Gene Wolfe's Book of Days (1981)
The Wolfe Archipelago (1983), consisting of:
  "Death of the Island Doctor" (1983)
  "The Island of Doctor Death and Other Stories" (1970)
  "The Death of Dr. Island" (1973)
  "The Doctor of Death Island" (1978)
Plan(e)t Engineering (1984) (published by Boskone when Wolfe was guest of honor; contains previously uncollected short stories, a new essay on Book of the New Sun and map, several poems, and an article by Wolfe on robots from Plant Engineering magazine)
Bibliomen (1984)
Storeys from the Old Hotel (1988) [winner of the World Fantasy Award for best collection]
Endangered Species (1989)
Castle of Days (1992) (omnibus of essay collection Castle of the Otter and story collection Gene Wolfe's Book of Days, along with other essays)
The Young Wolfe (1992)
Strange Travelers (2000)
Latro in the Mist (2003) – omnibus collection of Soldier of the Mist and Soldier of Arete
Innocents Aboard (2004)
Starwater Strains (2005)
The Best of Gene Wolfe (2009) A specialty press edition including an additional story and an introduction by Kim Stanley Robinson was published as The Very Best of Gene Wolfe.

Short stories 
 "Trip, Trap", first published in Orbit (1967)
 "The Changeling", first published in Orbit (1968)
 "Paul's Treehouse", first published in Orbit 5 (1969)
 "How the Whip Came Back", first published in Orbit 6 (1970)
 "Remembrance to Come", first published in Orbit 6 (1970)
 "Eyebem", first published in Orbit 7 (1970)
 "The Island of Doctor Death and Other Stories", first published in Orbit 7 (1970)
  "A Method Bit in “B”", first published in Orbit 8 (1970)
  "The HORARS of War", first published in Nova 1 (1970)
 "Alien Stones", first published in Orbit (1972)
 "The Headless Man", first published in Universe 2 (1972)
 "Against the Lafayette Escadrille", first published in Again, Dangerous Visions (1972)
 "How I Lost the Second World War and Helped Turn Back the German Invasion", first published in Analog Science Fiction and Fact (May 1973)
 "Continuing Westwards", first published in Orbit 12 (1973)
 "La Befana", first published in Galaxy Magazine (1973)
 "An Article About Hunting", first published in Saving Worlds (1973)
 "The Death of Doctor Island", first published in Universe 3 (1973)
 "Forlesen", first published in Orbit 14 (1974)
 "When I Was Ming the Merciless", first published in The Ides of Tomorrow: Original Science Fiction Tales of Horror (1976)
 "Many Mansions", first published in Orbit 19 (1977)
 "To the Dark Tower Came", first published in Orbit 19 (1977)
 "The Doctor of Death Island", first published in Immortal (1978)
 "The Adopted Father", first published in Isaac Asimov's Science Fiction Magazine (1980)
 "A Solar Labyrinth", first published in The Magazine of Fantasy & Science Fiction (April 1983)
 "The Cat", first published in the 1983 World Fantasy Convention program book
 "Death of the Island Doctor", first published in The Wolfe Archipelago (1983)
 "A Cabin on the Coast", first published in The Magazine of Fantasy & Science Fiction (1984)
 "The Map", first published in Light Years and Dark: Science Fiction and Fantasy Of and For Our Time (1984)
 "Ain't You 'Most Done", first published in The Sandman, Book of Dreams (1996)
 "Flash Company", first published in The Horns of Elfland (1997)
 "From the Cradle", first published in Shelf Life: Fantastic Stories Celebrating Bookstores (2002)
 "Memorare", first published in The Magazine of Fantasy & Science Fiction (2007)
 "Frostfree", first published in Shadows of the New Sun: Stories in Honor of Gene Wolfe (2013)

Chapbooks 
Wolfe published a number of short chapbooks, many published in very small quantities by Cheap Street. Some of these have been reprinted in his collections, as when Starwater Strains reprinted "Empires of Foliage and Flower".

At the Point of Capricorn (1983)
The Boy Who Hooked the Sun (1985)
Empires of Foliage and Flower: A Tale From the Book of the Wonders of Urth and Sky (1987)
The Arimaspian Legacy (1988)
Slow Children at Play (1989)
The Old Woman Whose Rolling Pin is the Sun (1991)
The Case of the Vanishing Ghost (1991) through The Pretentious Press
The Grave Secret (1991) through The Pretentious Press
The Hero as Werwolf (1991) Pulphouse Publishing
Talk of Mandrakes (2003)
Christmas Inn (2005)
Strange Birds (2006)
Memorare (2008) (novella, first published in The Magazine of Fantasy and Science Fiction in 2007, as a signed limited edition hardcover in 2008)

Other works 
The Castle of the Otter (1982) (a companion to The Book of the New Sun, later collected into Castle of Days)
Introduction to Patti Perret's The Faces of Science Fiction (1984)
Introduction to Nancy Kress's Trinity and other stories (1988)
Letters Home (1991) (collection of letters Wolfe sent home to his mother while he was fighting in the Korean War)
Introduction to Neil Gaiman's Sandman: Fables and Reflections
A Walking Tour of the Shambles (with Neil Gaiman) (2002)
Introduction to Vera Nazarian's Salt of the Air (2006)
Shadows of the New Sun: Essays (2007)
Introduction to John Cramer's Twistor (Dover Edition) (2016)

Critical studies and reviews of Wolfe's work
A borrowed man

References 

Bibliographies by writer
Bibliographies of American writers
Science fiction bibliographies